"Shake It Up Tonight" is a song by American singer Cheryl Lynn. Since the success of her debut single, "Got to Be Real", the acclaimed R&B-dance track peaked at No. 5 on both the R&B and Hot Dance Club Play charts, and it also scored number 70 on the Billboard pop charts. It failed to chart in the UK.

"Shake It Up Tonight" appears on Lynn's LP In the Night, and was written by Mike and Brenda Sutton. The B-side is "Baby", written by Cheryl Lynn and Ray Parker Jr. The ready-made disco song was a moderate success. It became a defining song for Lynn. The 7" version of the song was recorded and produced by Ray Parker Jr. who has worked with her. Jamaican singer Luciano covered the song as a number-one reggae hit in 1993.  The 12" version was mixed and produced by Ray Parker Jr.

The song was especially popular in the Los Angeles market. During late August it peaked at number 5 on KUTE and number 11 on KRLA.

Composition
"Shake It Up Tonight" has instrumentation that includes a dance beat, strings and percussion.

Personnel
Cheryl Lynn - Lead vocals, backing vocals
Greg Moore - Guitar
Ray Parker Jr. - Guitar, rhythm arrangements
Darren Carmichael - Fender Rhodes piano
Michael Sutton - Acoustic piano
Allen McGrier - Bass (uncredited on many releases of the parent album)
George Mitchell - Drums
Ollie E. Brown - Percussion
Arnell D. Carmichael, J.D. Nicholas, Sharon Jack - Backing vocals
Gene Page - String arrangements

Chart performance

7" version
 Shake It Up Tonight  – 3:58
 Baby  – 4:20

12" version
 "Shake It Up Tonight" – 5:42
 "Star Love" – 7:23

Sampling
This song has been sampled three times:
 "Party Right" by Chubb Rock featuring Kya
 "Get Ready" by Allen Walker
 "Party Right" by Freddy Fresh

References

1981 singles
Cheryl Lynn songs
1981 songs
CBS Records singles
Songs about dancing
Funk songs
Post-disco songs